Casey Simon Darnell (born September 24, 1978) is an American contemporary Christian singer and songwriter. Darnell released the album entitled Coming Alive in 2011, which was his first full-length studio album. This was followed by the 2013 eponymously titled release Casey Darnell, which both saw commercial successes via the Billboard charts. The last was generally well received by music critics.

Background
Darnell was born Casey Simon Darnell on September 24, 1978, in Lynchburg, Virginia to father Gary Darnell and mother Cathy Darnell. Darnell has a brother and a sister. He stayed in Virginia until he was three years old, and then the family moved to Georgia. He went all the way through school at Shiloh Hills Christian School in Kennesaw, and he attended college at Kennesaw State University where he studied Childhood Education and Communications. His father was a teacher at Shiloh Hills.

Personal life
Darnell married his wife Anisa on July 31, 2004, and the couple have four daughters.

Career

Darnell's early beginnings were as a youth pastor and a worship pastor/leader from 1998 to 2007.  Casey's shift to a recording artist began in 2008 with his independent album Words in Motion that released on May 11, 2008. His first studio project was the Casey Darnell EP in 2010, and his first studio LP was 2011's Coming Alive with North Point Music. The second studio album released in 2013 by North Point eponymously titled as Casey Darnell. The studio albums gained commercial charting successes via the Billboard charts.

Outside of writing and recording, Casey Darnell leads worship on a regular basis at North Point Community Church’s six Atlanta campuses. He also travels to other churches across the country to lead their worship services as well as various special events and student camps.

Band members
 Casey Darnell - vocals, acoustic guitar
 Nick Pirtle - electric guitar, keys
 Matt Powers - bass guitar
 Jonathan Matteson - drums, ablelton

Discography

Independent albums
 2008: Words in Motion - produced by Jon Duke and Jacob Arnold

Studio EPs

Studio albums

References

External links
 
 YouTube

1978 births
Living people
American performers of Christian music
Singers from Virginia
Singers from Georgia (U.S. state)
Musicians from Lynchburg, Virginia
People from Kennesaw, Georgia
Songwriters from Virginia
Songwriters from Georgia (U.S. state)
21st-century American singers
21st-century American male singers
American male songwriters